Adolf Leevald (also Adolf Levald; 1893 Varbola Parish – 1938) was an Estonian politician. He was a member of I Riigikogu. He was a member of the Riigikogu since 7 April 1922. He replaced Jaak Jakobson. On 29 September 1922, he was removed from his position and he was replaced by Jaan Tomp.

References

1893 births
1938 deaths
Members of the Riigikogu, 1920–1923